Jianchu (建初) was a Chinese era name used by several emperors of China. It may refer to:

Jianchu (76–84), era name used by Emperor Zhang of Han
Jianchu (386–394), era name used by Yao Chang, emperor of Later Qin
Jianchu (405–417), era name used by Li Gao, ruler of Western Liang